Beti Sekulovski (born 17 May 1983) is a former professional tennis player from Australia.

Biography
Sekulovski was born in Melbourne, to parents who emigrated from Macedonia.

On the professional tour, she had a highest singles ranking of 273 and was ranked 120 in the world for doubles.

She made two main-draw appearances in the women's doubles at the Australian Open, both times as a wildcard pairing with Cindy Watson.

Since retiring, she has worked as a tennis coach and is currently coaching Jaimee Fourlis.

ITF Circuit finals

Singles: 7 (4 titles, 3 runner-ups)

Doubles: 14 (4 titles, 10 runner-ups)

References

External links
 
 

1983 births
Living people
Australian female tennis players
Tennis players from Melbourne
Australian tennis coaches
Australian people of Macedonian descent